Sabah Nationality Party or  (PKS) is a Sabah-based-opposition party in Malaysia formed after the 2013 Malaysian general election. Following its establishment, the party contested in the 2018 Malaysian general election.

See also
Politics of Malaysia
List of political parties in Malaysia

References 

Political parties in Sabah
2013 establishments in Malaysia
Political parties established in 2013